Mook is the vandal moniker used by a Pittsburgh, Pennsylvania man Michael Monack and a Portland, Oregon man Marcus Edward Gunther.

Michael Monack (Pittsburgh, Pennsylvania)

Beginning 
Monack began as a tagger targeting the South Side and Shadyside neighborhoods, but after his tags were abated, he began placing his tags in hard to reach places, including tall bridges and highway overpasses. Monack was known to use the monikers "Mook" as well as "human hater". He was a part of a graffiti crew that called themselves the "Value Krew" or VK. The name means "knucklehead or idiot". He was an active graffiti writer in Pittsburgh from 1997 to early 2000s. He drew the ire of the then-Pittsburgh Mayor Thomas J. Murphy, Jr., who had tried to provide an outlet for individuals interested in graffiti to use the walls along the Eliza Furnace trail. He has etched "Mook" onto a Department of Public Works "Graffiti Busters" truck that was tasked with cleaning up graffiti. At one point, merchants from the South Side, tired of having their businesses targeted confronted Monack. He tagged "So you want to get tough?" on the Birmingham Bridge in response. Monack became known around the community for vandalizing previously unheard of places. According to Pittsburgh officials, "He's going into areas no one's gone before." He became known among law enforcement across Pennsylvania.  After the media coverage of Monack's "Mook" tagging in the Pittsburgh area, it is possible that multiple copycats have applied graffiti using the moniker "Mook". As Monack received more coverage for his daredevil mischief, handful of letters have been sent to the newspaper editors from opponents as well as supporters.

Legal issues 
On October 31, 2001, police arrested 18-year-old South Side resident Michael Monack and arraigned him on three counts of receiving stolen property. Police were led to his grandmother's house by an anonymous letter and other clues. On October 16, the police executed a search warrant at Monack's residence and found paint and other graffiti supplies. He was supposed to turn himself in on October 19, but he had fled the area instead. In October 2002, Monack was sentenced to thousands of dollars in fines and community service in exchange for his guilty plea to criminal mischief and defiant trespass. In March 2003, police arrested Monack again for continuing to engage in graffiti.  Monack was spotted in the Armstrong Tunnel at 5 am with two juvenile delinquents. He attempted to escape apprehension and fled to the South Tenth Street Bridge where he was arrested. Monack was charged with criminal mischief, conspiracy, possessing an instrument of a crime and corruption of a minor for being the group's "ringleader." His hearings were attended by neighborhood activists from areas he tagged. At the hearing, they expressed extreme displeasure at his behavior. During a 2002 hearing Judge Robert E. Colville said: “You’re not a criminal … but there’s some portion of you that may be brain dead.”

After graffiti 
As of 2004, Monack had become a tattoo artist in Pittsburgh. When asked by the Pittsburgh Tribune-Review about his opinion on the latest crop of the city's graffiti artists, he described them as "garbage." Though, even years after ceasing his tagging, Mook's "infamy precedes him in many circles of the city." By 2008, Monack was described as having been replaced in local urban folklore by a now deceased graffiti tagger Daniel Montano whose moniker is MFONE.

Marcus Edward Gunther (Portland, Oregon) 

Marcus Edward Gunther tagged over one hundred locations with the word "Mook" in the late 2010s and was sentenced to two years in prison in February 2019 for his repeated acts of spraying graffiti without permission.

The Oregon Department of Transportation and Portland Police Bureau began an investigation on June 29, 2018, after the letters "M-O-O-K" were spray painted onto newly installed electronic signs hanging over an Interstate 84 overpass in Northeast Portland. Police opened a second investigation on September 6, 2018, after the same tag was found on a U-Store self storage facility elsewhere in the city. On September 13, 2018, Portland resident Marcus Edward Gunther was arrested in connection with the two incidents. Gunther was arrested at the corner of Southwest 13th Ave and Southwest Main Street. He was lodged at the Multnomah County Jail on charges of Criminal mischief in the Second Degree (two counts), Criminal Mischief in the First Degree, and a probation violation. Gunther was a prolific graffiti vandal, leaving over 100 documented tags around the city. The Columbian reported that Gunther's graffiti tags have also been found in the nearby city of Vancouver, Washington.

Legal issues 
On February 8, 2019, Gunther pleaded guilty to four counts of first-degree criminal mischief and one count of second-degree criminal mischief. He was sentenced to two years in prison and will be required to pay a restitution of about $30,000 and enroll in five years of post-release drug treatment for his heroin and methamphetamine habits. As of September 14, 2018, Gunther has had one felony conviction, three misdemeanor convictions and three parole violations, including possession of heroin and DWI. According to Portland Tribune, He was charged with second-degree theft earlier in September 2018, and faced 10 charges for second-degree theft and criminal mischief in August 2018.

On February 11, 2019, Multnomah County District Attorney's Office announced:30-year-old Marcus Gunther changed his plea and was sentenced for causing nearly $30,000 in damages by illegally spray-painting on private property. "This is a sentence that holds Marcus Gunther accountable for his repeated acts of spraying graffiti without permission,” Multnomah County Senior Deputy District Attorney Nathan Vasquez, who prosecuted this case, said after sentencing. “It also provides Mr. Gunther an opportunity at treatment, which will benefit him and our entire community.” Gunther was arrested September 13, 2018 by members of the Portland Police Bureau. The change of plea and sentencing hearing occurred on February 8, 2019. Gunther was responsible for numerous acts of vandalism throughout Portland, Oregon. Primarily, he was spray-painting his "tag" on private property, which included Oregon Department of Transportation (ODOT) property.

References

External links
 

Living people
American male criminals
American tattoo artists
Year of birth missing (living people)
American graffiti artists